Aviación y Comercio, S.A., doing business as Aviaco, was a Spanish airline headquartered in the Edificio Minister in Madrid.

History

A group of local bankers provided the necessary funds for the acquisition of six Bristol 170s. Given that Iberia had exploited the most profitable domestic and international routes since the early 1940s, Aviaco restricted its operations to secondary routes. Scheduled passenger services started between Bilbao and Barcelona and Madrid. The first international route was Algiers–Palma–Marseilles, while Canary Islands-based flights were launched shortly afterwards. In 1954, the airline won the contract for operating an airmail service between Madrid and Barcelona. In 1955, the airline's headquarters were transferred from Bilbao to Madrid, and the Instituto Nacional de Industria (INI) took over a majority interest in the company.

The financial structure of the company was re-organised in 1959, when the capital was halved to ESP 50 million, whereas Iberia injected ESP 100 million, becoming the owner of ⅔ of the shares, with the balance being split between the initial shareholders and INI. The move permitted Aviaco to acquire three second-hand Convair 440s from Sabena. These were the airline's first pressurized aircraft. By , the company had 702 employees; a fleet of three Bristol 170s, three Convair 440s, five Heron IIs and five Languedocs served a route network that included Barcelona, Brussels, Casablanca, Las Palmas, Madrid, Oran, Palma, Tanger, Tenerife and Tetouan. Two Convair 240s were bought from Varig in 1962. In early 1964, the carrier signed a contract with Aviation Traders for the conversion of two of its DC-4s into Carvairs; the first converted airframe was delivered in  the same year.

By 1965, a joint Aviaco-Iberia board was set up to coordinate aviation policies, which ensured that Aviaco and Iberia routes did not compete with each other.

In 1973, Aviaco became the  airline worldwide in ordering the McDonnell Douglas DC-9-30, when it acquired six aircraft of the type. In , two more DC-9-30s were ordered. By , the fleet consisted of four Caravelle 10Rs, five DC-8-50s, six DC-9-30s and six F-27s, whereas two more DC-9-30s were on order. At this time, the carrier had 764 employees and the route network included Algiers, Alicante, Barcelona, Bilbao, Cordoba, Ibiza, La Coruña, Las Palmas, Madrid, Mahon, Málaga, Oran, Oviedo, Palma, Pamplona, Santander, Santiago, San Sebastian, Sevilla, Tenerife, Valencia and Vigo. Valued at  million, four more DC-9-30s were acquired in 1978. That year, Aviaco lost almost ESP 453 million. Another loss, equivalent to £3 million, was recorded for 1979, but these financial results were reverted in 1980, with the airline making a £5.5 million profit.

At , the company had more than  employees and it was 90%-owned by INI. Early in the decade, Aviaco incorporated five DC-8-63s that were phased out from Iberia's mainline fleet due to a renewal programme. Flight International informed in 1983 that the company had an initial order for 20 CN-235s, and that the order was boosted to 22 aircraft of the type late that year. By , the number of employees had grown to 1,751; the fleet comprised two DC-8-50Fs, 16 DC-9-30s, four DC-9-30Fs and nine Fokker F27-600s; the 22 CN-235s were still on order. During the decade, most of Aviaco shares were acquired by its competitor Iberia. From that time, Aviaco ran the less important domestic routes while Iberia served the international destinations and the most important national routes, such as the shuttle service Madrid-Barcelona. All the Aviaco technical, marketing and financial resources were transferred to Iberia. During this time, Aviaco had a fleet of Douglas DC-9 planes, which were painted in blue and white livery.

During the 1990s, the Asturias–London Stansted, Valladolid–Paris, Zaragoza–London Stansted and Zaragoza–Paris routes were added to the existing ones radiating from Madrid and serving Almeria, Badajoz, Barcelona, Bilbao, Fuerteventura, Granada, Ibiza, Jerez, La Coruña, Lanzarote, Las Palmas, Málaga, Mallorca, Menorca, Murcia, Oviedo, Palma, Pamplona, Reus, San Sebastian, Santander, Seville, Tenerife, Valencia, Valladolid, Vigo, Vitoria and Zaragoza. At , Aviaco had 1,696 employees and a fleet of eight Fokker F-27s, 20 McDonnell Douglas DC-9s and 13 MD-88s. Iberia's shareholding in Aviaco was boosted from 33% to 100% in 1998, when the Spanish flag carrier took control of 67% of the shares that were held by the SEPI.

During its heyday, Aviaco ("AO") was well known for operating charter flights primarily from Palma, Tenerife and Girona to almost every provincial airport in Europe, providing uplift for all major tour operators, such as Thomson, Enterprise, Cosmos and ILG. In fact, ILG's combined operations (Intasun, Lancaster, Global and Sol) signed an exclusive deal with AO to operate charters from all UK airports not covered by its own Air Europe brand. Aviaco earned itself a bad reputation in the international travel sector; it became known for its old aircraft (DC-9's), mediocre service and delays. However, the airline gained something of a cult status amongst travellers, who ultimately saw their Aviaco flight as part of the holiday experience.

During the mid-late 1980s, Aviaco sub-chartered aircraft from IBERIA to provide seasonal added capacity to its DC-9 fleet, which saw weekly forays of Iberia Boeing 727s, A300s and even Boeing 747-200s operating charter services on Aviaco's behalf into airports across Europe that had otherwise only handled 737 and DC9 sized aircraft up to that point.

Accidents and incidents

See also

 History of Iberia (airline)
 Transport in Spain

References

External links

 
Defunct airlines of Spain
Airlines established in 1948
Airlines disestablished in 1999
Spanish companies disestablished in 1999
Spanish companies established in 1948